The Rolls-Royce Camargue is a 2-door luxury saloon manufactured and marketed by Rolls-Royce Motors from 1975–1986. Designed by Paolo Martin at Pininfarina, the Camargue was the first post-war production Rolls-Royce not designed in-house (not including the more prolific coachbuilt Corniche by Mulliner-Park Ward, and the coachbuilt variants of production models such as Silver Wraith, Silver Cloud, and Silver Shadow which were built by firms such as James Young, Mulliner, Park Ward, Hooper, et al). 

The Camargue derives its name from the coastal region in southern France.

Debut and design

At launch, the Camargue was the Rolls-Royce flagship and the most expensive production car in the world.  At its official U.S. launch, the Camargue had already been on sale in the UK for over a year. The New York Times noted that the U.S. price at this stage was approximately $5,000 higher than the UK price. In the 1970s, many European models retailed for significantly less in the U.S. than they did in Europe in order to compete with prices set aggressively by Detroit's Big Three and Japanese importers. The manufacturer rejected this approach with the Camargue, referencing the high cost of safety and pollution engineering needed to adapt the few cars (approximately 30 per year) it expected to send to North America in 1976.

At its 1975 press debut, Rolls-Royce highlighted automatic split-level climate control system, the first of its kind. According to Rolls-Royce, the system's development took eight years.  The recommended price of a new Camargue at launch on the UK market in March 1975 was £29,250, including sales taxes. Rapid currency depreciation would greatly raise the price of the Camargue in the late 1970s, both in the UK and North America.

The Camargue shared its platform with the Rolls-Royce Corniche and Silver Shadow and was powered by the same  V8 engine as the Silver Shadow, although the Camargue engine was slightly more powerful. The transmission was also carried over – a General Motors Turbo-Hydramatic 3-speed automatic. The first 65 Camargues produced used SU carburettors, while the remaining carburetted cars used Solex units.  US delivered cars used Bosch Jetronic fuel injection during the 1980s which it shared with the Corniche and Silver Spirit/Spur. The Camargue was fitted with the Silver Shadow II's power rack and pinion steering rack in February 1977. In 1979, it received the rear independent suspension of the Silver Spirit.

With a  wheelbase, the Camargue was the first Rolls-Royce automobile to be designed to metric dimensions, and was the first Rolls-Royce to feature an inclined rather than perfectly vertical grille; the Camargue's grille was slanted at an angle of seven degrees.

The car was sold in very limited numbers in European, American, Canadian, Australian and Asian markets. Several of the cars have since been modified into convertibles by after-market customizers.

Reception
The Camargue received a varied reception, having ranked as one of the "10 Worst Cars"'as chosen in 2010 by readers of The Globe and Mail; having ranked 38 in the 2005 book Crap Cars by Richard Porter (the author saying the car "looked utterly terrible)" and having ranked 92 in a 2008 poll of the 100 ugliest cars of all time by readers of The Daily Telegraph. Autoblog said the Camargue had been ranked "conspicuously low on the list," adding the Camargue "really was horrid, no matter how well it sold."

In response, noted automotive journalist James May said the Camargue "is not ugly, either. It has presence, like that pug-faced but well-dressed bloke down the pub."

References

External links

 Rolls-Royce Camargue
 Technical data

Luxury vehicles
Flagship vehicles
Sedans
Camargue
Pininfarina
Rear-wheel-drive vehicles
1980s cars
Cars introduced in 1975
Cars discontinued in 1986